Inger Koppernæs (15 August 1928 – 15 August 1990) was a Norwegian politician for the Conservative Party. She was Minister of Transport and Communications from 1981 to 1983. She was deputy representative to the Storting from 1973 to 1981 and permanent representative from 1981 to 1989.

References

1928 births
1990 deaths
Ministers of Transport and Communications of Norway
Members of the Storting
Conservative Party (Norway) politicians
20th-century Norwegian politicians